Walter Turner Monckton, 1st Viscount Monckton of Brenchley,  (17 January 1891 – 9 January 1965) was a British lawyer and politician.

Early years
Monckton was born in the village of Plaxtol in north Kent. He was the eldest child of paper manufacturer Frank William Monckton (1861–1924), and his wife, Dora Constance (d. 1915). He was head boy of his preparatory school, The Knoll, at Woburn Sands in Buckinghamshire, and attended Harrow School from 1904 to 1910. He played cricket for Harrow against Eton in the famous Fowler's match in 1910. He chose to enter Balliol College, Oxford, as a commoner, despite in 1910 having won an Exhibition to Hertford College. Whilst at Oxford, he played a first-class match for the combined Oxford and Cambridge Universities cricket team in 1911. In 1912 he obtained a third class in Classical Moderations and in 1914 a second in modern history. He was elected president of the Oxford Union in 1913.

Career
Monckton was called to the bar at the Inner Temple in 1919. In 1927 he was appointed legal advisor to the Simon Commission. He took silk in 1930.

Monckton served as advisor to Edward VIII during the abdication crisis, having been Attorney General to the Duchy of Cornwall since 1932. He was Recorder of Hythe from 1930 to 1937. Thanks to his royal connections, he was appointed constitutional advisor to the last Nizam of Hyderabad.

He worked in propaganda and information during World War II and became Solicitor General in Winston Churchill's 1945 caretaker government, although he refused to join the Conservative Party.

After the 1945 general election, Monckton returned to legal practice. He also continued to serve as advisor to the Nizam of Hyderabad.

He finally joined the Conservative Party after the war and became a Member of Parliament for Bristol West at a 1951 by-election. Churchill soon appointed him to the cabinet as Minister of Labour and National Service, in which post he served from 1951 to 1955. He was Anthony Eden's Minister of Defence 1955–56, but was the only cabinet minister to oppose his Suez policy, and was moved to Paymaster-General 1956–57.

Monckton was created Viscount Monckton of Brenchley, of Brenchley in the County of Kent on 11 February 1957. He had wanted to become Lord Chief Justice of England and Wales and indeed had been promised the job by Churchill and the two subsequent prime ministers, but in 1957 he decided instead to join the board of Midland Bank.

Monckton was chairman of Midland Bank (1957–64), President of the Marylebone Cricket Club (1956–1957), President of Surrey County Cricket Club (1950–52 and 1959–65), Chairman of the Iraq Petroleum Company (1958), Chairman of the Advisory Commission on Central Africa (1960), and Chancellor of the University of Sussex (1961–65).

In 1960 he headed the Monckton Commission that concluded that the Federation of Rhodesia and Nyasaland could not be maintained except by force or through massive changes in racial legislation. It advocated a majority of African members in the Nyasaland and Northern Rhodesian legislatures and giving these territories the option to leave the Federation after five years.

Personal life

He married Polly Colyer-Fergusson, daughter of Sir Thomas Colyer-Fergusson, the family who owned Ightham Mote, Sevenoaks. In 1947, he married, secondly, to Bridget Monckton, 11th Lady Ruthven of Freeland, CBE, the wartime head of the ATS counterpart in India, the Women's Army Corps (India), and also of the Women's Royal Indian Naval Service (WRINS).

He was succeeded by his son Gilbert, born of his first marriage, on his death in 1965 at the age of 73.

Arms

References

; cited as ODNB.

Sources
The life of Viscount Monckton of Brenchley, Frederick Winston Furneaux-Smith, (1969)
Walter Monckton, H. Montgomery Hyde, (1991), 
Cricinfo profile

External links 

 
 Monckton at the National Portrait Gallery

1891 births
1965 deaths
Alumni of Balliol College, Oxford
British Secretaries of State
Conservative Party (UK) MPs for English constituencies
English cricketers
English cricket administrators
Knights Commander of the Order of St Michael and St George
Knights Grand Cross of the Royal Victorian Order
Members of the Privy Council of the United Kingdom
People of the Iraq Petroleum Company
Presidents of the Marylebone Cricket Club
Presidents of the Oxford Union
Presidents of Surrey County Cricket Club
Solicitors General for England and Wales
UK MPs 1951–1955
UK MPs 1955–1959
UK MPs who were granted peerages
Attorneys-General of the Duchy of Cornwall
Oxford and Cambridge Universities cricketers
English King's Counsel
Ministers in the Churchill caretaker government, 1945
Ministers in the third Churchill government, 1951–1955
Ministers in the Eden government, 1955–1957
People from Tonbridge and Malling (district)
People from Brenchley
Viscounts created by Elizabeth II
British expatriates in India
People educated at Harrow School